Trần Tuấn Anh  (born 6 April 1964 in Hanoi) is a Vietnamese politician. His family is originally from Đức Phổ District, Quảng Ngãi Province. He was the Minister of Industry and Trade of Vietnam and a member of the National Assembly of Vietnam 14th term of 2016-2021 of the delegation of the National Assembly of Quảng Ngãi. He attended the Central Economic Commission on February 6, 2021. Before, he had been President of Ho Chi Minh City University of Industry, Vice Chairman of People's Committee of Cần Thơ City and Consul General of Vietnam in San Francisco. Between 2011 and 2013 he was also rector of the Industrial University of Ho Chi Minh City.

Anh became member of the Communist Party of Vietnam on November 29, 1996.

Personal life
His father was Trần Đức Lương, who would later serve as the 5th President of Vietnam. Anh was born in Hanoi, as his father was a geologist of the Geological Mapping Division of Vietnam from 1955 to 1987, headquartered in Hanoi.

References

External links

1964 births
Living people
Members of the 13th Politburo of the Communist Party of Vietnam
Members of the 12th Central Committee of the Communist Party of Vietnam
Members of the 13th Central Committee of the Communist Party of Vietnam